Fajr (meaning "dawn") is an Iranian satellite which was launched on 2 February 2015.

It is the first Iranian satellite to use a cold-gas thruster system, to conduct orbital maneuvers and increase its service life by raising its orbit to prevent a fast decay. An experimental GPS system developed by Iran is also part of the spacecraft. The Fajr satellite is expected to operate for 1.5 years.

Fajr was launched by a Safir-1B rocket from the Iranian Space Agency's launch site in Semnan city. The launch took place at around 08:50:00 UTC on 2 February 2015, Iran's national day of space and the sixth anniversary of the country's first successful orbital launch. The satellite was deployed into a low Earth orbit with a perigee of 224 km, an apogee of 470 km, an inclination of 55.53°, and an orbital period of 91.5 minutes. Fajr reentered in the Earth's atmosphere on 26 February 2015 after 23.8 days in orbit. Apparently, it performed no maneuvers during its orbital lifetime.

References

Spacecraft launched in 2015
Satellites of Iran
2015 in Iran